Vostochny is a rural locality (a village) in Kashkalashinsky Selsoviet, Blagovarsky District, Bashkortostan, Russia. The population was 297 as of 2010. There are 4 streets.

Geography 
Vostochny is located 26 km northeast of Yazykovo (the district's administrative centre) by road. Zapadny is the nearest rural locality.

References 

Rural localities in Blagovarsky District